Pawana (or: Awaité Pawana) is a short story written in French by French Nobel laureate J. M. G. Le Clézio.

Historical basis
According to the author this is a true story about the whaler Charles Melville Scammon (1825–1911). In December 1857, Charles Scammon, in the brig Boston, along with his schooner-tender Marin, entered Laguna Ojo de Liebre (Jack-Rabbit Spring Lagoon), later known as Scammon's Lagoon, and found one of the Gray Whale's last refuges. The story resembles the tale of Captain Ahab in Herman Melville's Moby-Dick, who was also on the deck of a wooden ship searching for a white whale.

Pawana is about the discovery of a lagoon in Mexico at the end of the 19th century where gray whales went to reproduce. After Captain Scammon mistakenly decided to exterminate the whales, he realized that he had made a mistake so terrible it could become irreparable. Captain Scammon then set about dedicating his life's work to saving these whales (and was helped by a Mexican revolutionary in doing so).

Meaning of "Awaité Pawana"
"Awaité Pawana" is the cry uttered by the lookout when he spies the whales.

Narrative
Araceli, the old Indian slave from Nantucket tells a young cabin boy about the exploits of the Indians of the past through mime and gesture. John, the eighteen-year-old cabin boy and Captain Scammon alternate in recounting a journey.

Adaptions
Georges Lavaudant staged Pawana for the Festival d'Avignon

Reviews
Read a ten page review of "Awaite Pawana" online

Publication history

First French edition

Second French edition

Third French edition

First English translation
"Awaité Pawana" was translated into English as  "Pawana" by Christophe Brunski
(AGNI Magazine:published at Boston University (2008). There  is a translation available online.

References

1992 short stories
Works by J. M. G. Le Clézio
French short stories
Fiction about whales